BBC West is one of BBC's English Regions serving Bristol, the majority of Wiltshire and Gloucestershire; northern and eastern Somerset and northeastern Dorset.

Services

Television
BBC West's television service (broadcast on BBC One) consists of the flagship regional news service BBC Points West, the topical magazine programme Inside Out West and a 30 minute political programme Sunday Politics.

Radio
The region is the controlling centre for BBC Radio Bristol, BBC Radio Gloucestershire & BBC Radio Wiltshire

Radio Bristol, Radio Gloucestershire and Radio Wiltshire broadcast local programming every day between 5am and 7pm, while BBC Somerset was broadcast by BBC South West local programming at breakfast from Monday to Saturday, weekday drivetime and Saturday afternoons, simulcasting Radio Bristol at all other times. The three stations simulcast networked programming each evening, joined by stations in the BBC South West region at weekends. Radio Bristol also broadcasts through the night on Fridays, Saturdays and Sundays.

Online and interactive
BBC West also produces regional news and local radio pages for the BBC Red Button and BBC Local websites for each county.

History
BBC West launched a regional television service from Bristol in September 1957. Initially broadcast from the Wenvoe transmitter on the outskirts of Cardiff, the geographical nature of the Wenvoe signal meant the first regional news bulletins were broadcast to both Wales and the West of England, sharing a ten-minute timeslot with News from Wales.

Until December 1960, news bulletins from Bristol also served the south coast of England, which latterly received its own regional programme. The weekday timeslot for regional news extended to 25 minutes in September 1962 – around this time, the West of England bulletin became known as Points West while the Welsh bulletins received a more comprehensive relaunch as BBC Wales Today.

The opening of a second signal from Wenvoe in February 1964 finally allowed the split of BBC television in Wales and the West. A separate BBC Wales channel was launched while BBC West became a full regional opt-out service to the extent seen in other English regions, with Points West becoming a full-length programme.

Points West continued until 1991, when the service was renamed BBC News West. The Points West brand was revived on Monday 22 May 2000 with the launch of the BBC's generic regional news graphics and presentation.

Studios

BBC West's regional broadcasting centre is located on Whiteladies Road in the Clifton area of Bristol with local radio studios and television bureaux also in Bath, Gloucester, Swindon and Taunton.

The Bristol studios are the main base for Points West, BBC Radio Bristol and various regional and, previously, network programmes. Network output is now made at other specially built facilities or does not use a studio. The site originally had two studios, A and B, which catered for all output - network programming was produced from Studio A and Points West and other regional output from Studio B. Studio A was closed in 1991 as a cost-saving measure, and in 1996 the site was altered so that new gallery facilities were inserted into part of Studio A. The now smaller Studio A is now used for Points West, while Studio B has been demolished.

See also

BBC English Regions
BBC Radio Bristol 
BBC Radio Gloucestershire
BBC Wiltshire
BBC Somerset

External links

West
Television channels and stations established in 1952